Denmark is a community in the Canadian province of Nova Scotia, located in  Colchester County. The Sutherland Steam Mill Museum lies in Denmark.

References
 Denmark  on Destination Nova Scotia

Communities in Colchester County
General Service Areas in Nova Scotia